Krishna (born 8 July 1977) known by his stage name Srinagara Kitty, is an Indian actor who primarily works in Kannada television series and films. He started off as a child artist working in a host of television serialized dramas before making his film debut in 2003 in small supporting roles.

His first major film as a lead actor was Inthi Ninna Preethiya (2008) which opened to positive reviews with his performance being noted. Following this, he featured in many feature films, notably Mathe Mungaru (2010), Savaari (2009), Hudugaru (2011) and Sanju Weds Geetha (2011). The success of these films established him as one of the leading actors in Kannada cinema.

Family and early background
Kitty comes from a joint family where he is the last child born to his parents. He is married to TV producer Bhavana Belegere and is the son-in-law of noted writer, journalist and TV Presenter Ravi Belagere.

Career

Television
He started his career early as a Child artist with TV serials like – Malanadina Chitragalu, Doddamane, Kandana Kavya among many others. During this time, he was even active in stage plays and acted in plays like Kaadu, Kappe Bhavi Nakshatra, Akka, Namma Nimmagalobba, Sanje Mallige.

Post his education, he starred TV serials for ETV, Udaya and Suvarna – prominent among them being, Chandrika, Preethigagi, Ananda Sagara, Mane Mane Kathe and Bhoomi.

Films
Kitty made his debut in films with the 2003 Kannada film Chandra Chakori, in which he appeared in a negative role. He then appeared in negative roles with films like Gowdru, Love Story, Aadhi, Ayya and Vishnusene most of which releases in the year 2005.

He made his debut in a lead role in Giri and followed it with Inthi Ninna Preethiya which gave him stardom. He then appeared in Olave Jeevana Lekkachaara, Janumada Gelathi, Mathe Mungaru, Savaari, Male Barali Manju Irali, Swayamvara, Sanju Weds Geetha and Hudugaru, all of which saw moderate success with Sanju Weds Geetha and Hudugaru seeing success at the box-office. His performance in Savaari won him the Filmfare Special Jury Award.

Gifted with a great baritone, Kitty has also lent his voice for the character of Lord Ram in a radio programme titled Radio Ramayana which is aired on Fever 104 FM, Bangalore.

In 2014, Kitty appeared in a triple role in the film Bahuparak and also sang the song "Simple Preethige" for the film.

Awards and accolades 
 2009 - Filmfare Special Jury Award - Savaari

Filmography

As actor

Cameo appearance

References

External links 
 
 Srinagara Kitty filmography

Male actors in Kannada cinema
Indian male film actors
1977 births
Indian male television actors
Filmfare Awards South winners
Living people
Male actors from Bangalore
Male actors in Kannada television
21st-century Indian male actors
Male actors in Tamil cinema
Kannada film producers
Film producers from Bangalore